The Ologhe community is one of the communities making up the Ebelle Kingdom in Igueben Local Government Area of Edo State, Nigeria. Written records do not exist about their origin. However, other things that are known about this people is that, like other confederating parts of Ebelle kingdom such as Eguare, Okuta, Idumowu and Okpujie, they are predominantly farmers, palm-wine tappers, and hunters.

Ethnic groups in Nigeria